Al-Mu'tasim is a town in Saladin Governorate, Iraq, near the city of Samarra. It is named for the 9th-century caliph Al-Mu'tasim who founded Samarra as his capital city.

History
In June 2014 al-Mu'tasim was the scene of fighting between Iraqi government forces and the insurgent Islamic State of Iraq and the Levant (ISIL).

References

Populated places in Saladin Governorate